The following lists events that happened during 1969 in Somalia.

Incumbents
President: 
 until 15 October: Abdirashid Ali Shermarke
 15 October-21 October: Sheikh Mukhtar Mohamed Hussein
 starting 21 October: Siad Barre
Prime Minister: Muhammad Haji Ibrahim Egal (until 1 November)

Events

 October 15 – President Abdirashid Ali Shermarke is assassinated by one of his own bodyguards in the town of Las Anod.
 October 21 – General Siad Barre comes to power in Somalia in a coup d'état, 6 days after the assassination of President Abdirashid Ali Shermarke.

Births

 November 13 – Ayaan Hirsi Ali, Somali-born Dutch American activist

References

 
1960s in Somalia
Years of the 20th century in Somalia
Somalia
Somalia